Border Wars is an American documentary television series on the National Geographic Channel. The program follows agents of the U.S. Border Patrol (USBP), U.S. Customs and Border Protection (CBP), Immigration and Customs Enforcement (ICE), and other divisions of the Department of Homeland Security as they investigate and apprehend illegal immigrants, drug smugglers, and other criminals violating immigration laws. The series also follows Air Interdiction Agents, and Marine Interdiction Agents who patrol along the U.S.-Mexico border, as well as southern Florida and Puerto Rico.

Episodes

Series overview

Season 1 (2010)

Season 2 (2010–11)

Season 3 (2011)

Season 4 (2012)

Season 5 (2012–13)

Reception
Common Sense Media rated the show 3 out of 5 stars.

References

External links

2010s American documentary television series
2010 American television series debuts
2015 American television series endings
National Geographic (American TV channel) original programming